Richard Floer (11 April 1767 – 28 August 1822) was a Norwegian mining official and military officer who served as a representative at the Norwegian Constitutional Assembly.  

Richard Henriksen Floer was born in Grindtvedt at  Kvikne in Hedmark, Norway.  He started his career as a cadet at the Røros Copper Works in Sør-Trøndelag during 1791. He worked in positions within various departments at  Røros, including inspection, housing and communications. He also served as a captain in the Røros Volunteer Mountain Corps (Frivillige Røraasiske Berg-Jægerkorps). Floer was awarded the Order of the Dannebrog for his military services during the war in 1808. He represented the Røros Volunteer Mountain Corps at the Norwegian Constituent Assembly at Eidsvoll in 1814.

References

External links
Representantene på Eidsvoll 1814 (Cappelen Damm AS)
 Men of Eidsvoll (eidsvollsmenn)

Related Reading
Holme Jørn (2014) De kom fra alle kanter - Eidsvollsmennene og deres hus  (Oslo: Cappelen Damm) 

1767 births
1822 deaths
People from Hedmark
Order of the Dannebrog
Norwegian Army personnel
Norwegian military personnel of the Napoleonic Wars
Fathers of the Constitution of Norway